is a Japanese football player. He plays for Blaublitz Akita.

Career
Akihito Ozawa joined Japan Football League club SP Kyoto FC in 2015. He moved to J1 League club Albirex Niigata in 2016, then to J3 League club Blaublitz Akita in 2017.

Club statistics
Updated to 13 December 2022.

Honours
 Blaublitz Akita
 J3 League (1): 2017

References

External links
Profile at Blaublitz Akita

1992 births
Living people
Kokushikan University alumni
Association football people from Saitama Prefecture
Japanese footballers
J1 League players
J3 League players
Japan Football League players
SP Kyoto FC players
Albirex Niigata players
Blaublitz Akita players
AC Nagano Parceiro players
Association football goalkeepers